Stella Jones may refer to:
 Stella Jones (Emmerdale), character in TV-series Emmerdale
 Stella Jones (singer), singer who represented Austria in the Eurovision Song Contest 1995
 Stella Jones (writer), New Zealand playwright